Júlio Alberto Pereira Neiva (born 28 March 1996 in Barcelos) is a Portuguese professional footballer who plays for Lusitânia as a goalkeeper.

Football career
On 30 July 2016, Neiva made his professional debut with Gil Vicente  in a 2016–17 Taça da Liga match against Académica.

On 28 June 2018, Neiva agreed to a one-year deal with Académica de Coimbra.

References

External links

Stats and profile at LPFP 
National team data 

1996 births
Living people
People from Barcelos, Portugal
Portuguese footballers
Association football goalkeepers
Liga Portugal 2 players
Gil Vicente F.C. players
A.R.C. Oleiros players
Associação Académica de Coimbra – O.A.F. players
AD Oliveirense players
F.C. Felgueiras 1932 players
Lusitânia F.C. players
Portugal youth international footballers
Sportspeople from Braga District